Mount Sullivan is a mountain, 2,070 m, standing 12 nautical miles (22 km) east of the north part of the Eternity Range, in Palmer Land. This feature lies in the area explored from the air by Sir Hubert Wilkins in 1928 and Lincoln Ellsworth in 1935, but it was first charted by the British Graham Land Expedition (BGLE) in 1936–37. It was photographed from the air in 1940 by the United States Antarctic Service (USAS) and in 1947 by the Ronne Antarctic Research Expedition (RARE) under Ronne. Named by Ronne for Colonel H.R. Sullivan of the Office of Research and Development of the then United States Army Air Forces (USAAF), which furnished equipment for the expedition.

References

Mountains of Palmer Land